AL-1095, is a centrally acting stimulant drug with comparable effects to amphetamine, developed by Bristol in the 1970s.

Synthesis

The first-step is a mixed-aldol condensation between 3-quinuclidinone [3731-38-2] (1) and benzaldehyde (2) gives 2-benzylidene-3-oxoquinuclidine [24123-89-5] (3). The conjugate addition of the Grignard reagent formed from 4-bromochlorobenzene [106-39-8] (4) to the enone gives the benzhydryl (5). MPV reduction of the carbonyl gives the syn stereoisomers, whereas borohydride gave trans. Both diastereoisomers are active but in only one of the enantiomers.

See also 
 Butyltolylquinuclidine
 Desoxypipradrol
 SCH-5472

References 

Stimulants
2-Benzylpiperidines
Quinuclidines
Chloroarenes
Secondary alcohols